The Diario Romano (Italian for Roman Diary) was a booklet published annually at Rome, with papal authorisation, giving the routine of feasts and fasts to be observed in Rome and the ecclesiastical functions to be performed in the city.

Literature 
Camillo Cybo (ed.): Diario Romano dell' anno MDCCXXX, Rom 1730. (Scan by Google Books)

References

Catholic holy days